Woodhill is a neighborhood in southeast Lexington, Kentucky, United States. Its boundaries are Richmond Road to the west, New Circle Road to the north, Palumbo Drive to the east, and Man o' War Boulevard to the south.

Neighborhood statistics

 Population: 5,684
 Land area: 
 Population density: 3,893 persons per sq mile
 Median household income: $30,212

Neighborhoods in Lexington, Kentucky